Shortcut to Happiness is a 2007 film adaptation of the Stephen Vincent Benet classic 1936 short story "The Devil and Daniel Webster". It stars Alec Baldwin, Jennifer Love Hewitt, and Anthony Hopkins. Baldwin also directed the film. Shot in early 2001 in New York City, the film was plagued with financial difficulties and was shelved for several years. Yari Film Group eventually bought and released the film to theaters in 2007.

Plot
Jabez Stone is a desperate, down-on-his-luck writer who hits rock bottom when his close friend, Julius Jensen, finds success. In his attempts to get his work published, he meets a beautiful stranger who offers him a chance at fame and fortune in exchange for his soul. Stone, having lost faith in himself, agrees to the offer.

After accepting the deal, Jabez is quickly lavished with all he had ever dreamed of: a book deal, money, women, notoriety, Stone now has it all. However, despite the success, he is losing the friendship, respect and trust of those around him. Coming to the realization that he did not quite get everything that he bargained for, Stone begs the devil to release him from their deal. When the devil scoffs, he turns to famed orator Daniel Webster. The two conclude that they should take the battle to court with Webster defending Stone in an otherworldly trial against the devil in the ultimate battle of wits in a fight over the fate of Stone's soul.

Cast

In addition, authors Gay Talese and George Plimpton make cameo appearances as themselves.

Production history
Shot in early 2001 in New York City, the film was plagued with financial difficulties. Baldwin said the movie was taken from him during post-production, because "[s]ome of the film's investors are being investigated for bank fraud". Due to this and other creative differences, Baldwin had his name removed from the directing credit; the name was ultimately replaced with the pseudonym "Harry Kirkpatrick". Bob Yari bought the film from a bankruptcy court for an undisclosed amount, which was said to be several million dollars. Once the film was cleared to be sold for distribution, a rough cut was screened at film festivals in 2003 and 2004, though much of the film's post-production work was not finished. The film needed further financing to complete the editing and special effects, and to replace temporary music.

In July 2006 it was announced that Yari's company would work on finishing the film. In 2007 the Yari Film Group announced the acquisition of the film and distribution plans.

Rating
This film is rated PG-13 by the MPAA for language and sexual content.

Reception

Box office
Shortcut to Happiness grossed $686,846 at the box office, against a budget of $30 million.

Critical response

Shortcut to Happiness received negative reviews from critics.

References

External links

2007 films
Films directed by Alec Baldwin
Films based on short fiction
Films about writers
Films scored by Christopher Young
The Devil and Daniel Webster
2000s English-language films
MoviePass Films films
Films with screenplays by Bill Condon
Films set in 2001
2007 directorial debut films
American comedy-drama films
2000s American films